Rhipicephalus haemaphysaloides is a hard-bodied tick of the genus Rhipicephalus. It is one of the major medically important ticks in the world.

Distribution
It is found in Indonesia, Myanmar, India, Sri Lanka, Thailand, Pakistan, and Vietnam.

Parasitism
It is an obligate ectoparasite of domestic mammals such as cattle, horses, sheep, and dogs. It is a potential vector of babesiosis and human Kyasanur Forest disease. It is a three-host tick.

References

External links

Lipopolysaccharide-Induced Differential Expression of miRNAs in Male and Female Rhipicephalus haemaphysaloides Ticks
LIFE CYCLE OF RHIPICEPHALUS HAEMAPHYSALOIDES SUPINO, 1897 (ACARI: IXODIDAE) UNDER LABORATORY CONDITIONS
Isolation and characterization of two novel serpins from the tick Rhipicephalus haemaphysaloides
Biological character of Rhipicephalus haemaphysaloides haemaphysaloides in Fujian, China 1992

Ticks
Animals described in 1897
Ixodidae